Robert Alan Sampson (born June 23, 1992) is an American professional basketball player. He is the son of Hall of Fame player Ralph Sampson and the younger brother of Ralph Sampson III.

References

External links
Georgia Tech Yellow Jackets bio

1992 births
Living people
American expatriate basketball people in Argentina
American expatriate basketball people in Montenegro
American men's basketball players
Atenas basketball players
Basketball players from Sacramento, California
East Carolina Pirates men's basketball players
Georgia Tech Yellow Jackets men's basketball players
KK Mornar Bar players
Grand Rapids Drive players
CSM Focșani players
Earth Friends Tokyo Z players
Tokyo Hachioji Bee Trains players
Yamaguchi Patriots players
Power forwards (basketball)